Eynort  is a small remote hamlet, situated at the head of Loch Eynort, on the west coast of the Isle of Skye, Scottish Highlands and is in the Scottish council area of Highland. The ruins of a chapel dedicated to St Maelrubha are located at Eynort.

References

External links

Canmore - Skye, Cnoc Loisgte site record
Canmore - Skye, Lechd A'Chleirich, Eynort site record

Populated places in the Isle of Skye